Tribhuvan Ram is an Indian politician and member of the 18th Legislative Assembly of Uttar Pradesh as a Bharatiya Janata Party candidate representing Ajagara constituency of Uttar Pradesh. He was a member of the 16th Legislative Assembly from 2012 to 2017 as a Bahujan Samaj Party representative.

Personal life
Tribhuvan Ram was born to K. B. Ram in Jaunpur, Uttar Pradesh on 15 January 1949. He holds an engineering degree from Indian Institute of Technology (BHU) Varanasi. Ram married Snehlata on 28 November 1978, with whom he has two sons.

Political career
Ram has been a MLA for two terms. He represented Ajagara as a member of the Bahujan Samaj Party in the Sixteenth Legislative Assembly of Uttar Pradesh. 

In the 2017 election, Ram lost to Kailash Nath Sonkar of Suheldev Bhartiya Samaj Party. After which, Ram joined Bharatiya Janta Party on 6 December 2019.

IN the 2022 Uttar Pradesh Legislative Assembly election, Ram again won from Ajagara with 101,088 votes, succeeding Sonkar in the process.

Posts held

See also

 Uttar Pradesh Legislative Assembly

References

Uttar Pradesh MLAs 2012–2017
Living people
1949 births
Bahujan Samaj Party politicians from Uttar Pradesh
People from Jaunpur, Uttar Pradesh
Uttar Pradesh politicians
Bharatiya Janata Party politicians from Uttar Pradesh
Uttar Pradesh MLAs 2022–2027